Paul Browne may refer to:

 Paul Browne (archer) (born 1961), British Paralympic archer
 Paul Browne (footballer) (born 1975), retired Scottish football defender
 Paul Browne (hurler) (born 1989), Irish hurler

See also 
 Paul Brown (disambiguation)